Frédérique Massat (born 14 January 1964) was a member of the National Assembly of France.  She represented the Ariège department,  and is a member of the Socialist, Radical, Citizen and Miscellaneous Left.

References

National Assembly of France profile 

1964 births
Living people
Women members of the National Assembly (France)
Deputies of the 13th National Assembly of the French Fifth Republic
Deputies of the 14th National Assembly of the French Fifth Republic
21st-century French women politicians